Too Cute is an American television series that aired on Animal Planet from  to .

Series overview

Episodes

Season 1 (2011)

Season 2 (2012)

Season 3 (2012–13)

Season 4 (2013)
*The "Animal BFFs" specials in this season are 30 minutes long.

Season 5 (2014)
*The "Pint-Size" episodes in this season are 30 minutes long.

Season 6 (2015)
*The "Pint-Size" episodes in this season are 30 minutes long.

Too Cute